In mathematical physics, the Gordon decomposition (named after Walter Gordon) of the Dirac current is a splitting of the charge or particle-number current into a part that arises from the motion of the center of mass of the particles and a part that arises from gradients of the spin density. It makes explicit use of the Dirac equation and so it applies only to "on-shell" solutions of the Dirac equation.

Original statement
For any solution  of the massive Dirac equation, 

the Lorentz covariant number-current   may be expressed as

where 

is the spinor generator of Lorentz transformations, 
and

is the Dirac adjoint.

The corresponding momentum-space version for plane wave solutions  and  obeying 

is 

where

Proof 
One  sees that from Dirac's equation that

and, from the adjoint of Dirac's equation,

Adding these two equations yields

From Dirac algebra, one may show that Dirac matrices satisfy

Using this relation,

which amounts to just the Gordon decomposition, after some algebra.

Utility
The second, spin-dependent, part of the current coupled to the photon field,  yields, up to an ignorable total divergence,

that is, an effective Pauli moment term, .

Massless generalization
This decomposition of the current into a particle number-flux (first term) and bound spin contribution (second term) requires . 

If one assumed that the given solution has energy  so that ,  one might obtain a decomposition that is valid for both massive and massless cases.

Using the Dirac equation again, one finds that 

Here , and 

with 

so that 

where  is the vector of Pauli matrices.

solution of finite extent, one may interpret the first term in the decomposition as the current , due to particles moving at speed . 

The second term,  is the current due to the gradients in the intrinsic magnetic moment density. The magnetic moment itself is found by integrating by parts to show that

For a single massive particle in its rest frame, where , the magnetic moment  reduces to

For a single massless particle obeying the right-handed Weyl equation, the spin-1/2 is locked to the direction  of its kinetic momentum and the magnetic moment becomes

Angular momentum density
For both the massive and massless cases, one also has an expression for the momentum density as part of the symmetric Belinfante–Rosenfeld stress–energy tensor 

Using the Dirac equation one may evaluate  to find the energy density to be , and the momentum density,  

If one used the non-symmetric canonical energy-momentum tensor 

one would not find the bound spin-momentum contribution.
 
By an integration by parts one finds that the spin contribution to the total angular momentum is 

This is what is expected, so the division by 2 in the spin contribution to the momentum density is necessary. The absence of a division by 2 in the formula for the current reflects the  gyromagnetic ratio of the electron. In other words, a spin-density gradient is twice as effective at making an electric current as it is at contributing to the linear momentum.

Spin in Maxwell's equations
Motivated by the Riemann–Silberstein vector form of Maxwell's equations, Michael Berry uses the Gordon strategy to obtain gauge-invariant expressions for the intrinsic spin angular-momentum density for solutions to Maxwell's equations.

He assumes that the solutions are monochromatic and uses the phasor expressions , . The time average of the Poynting vector momentum density is then given by 

As 

and for a fluid with intrinsic angular momentum density  we have 

these identities suggest that the spin density can be identified as either

or 
 
The two decompositions coincide when the field is paraxial. They also coincide when the field is a pure helicity state – i.e. when  where the helicity  takes the values  for light that is right or left circularly polarized respectively. In other cases they may differ.

References

Equations of physics